Montesia elegantula is a species of beetle in the family Cerambycidae. It was described by Monné in 1979.

References

Aerenicini
Beetles described in 1979